Ozophorini is a tribe of dirt-colored seed bugs in the family Rhyparochromidae. There are more than 30 genera and 220 described species in Ozophorini.

Genera
These 31 genera belong to the tribe Ozophorini:

 Allotrophora Slater & Brailovsky, 1983
 Balboa Distant, 1893
 Bedunia Stal, 1874
 Bergidea Breddin, 1897
 Brailovskyocoris Slater, 1994
 Bryanellocoris Slater, 1957
 Cervicoris Slater, 1982
 Cryptotrophora Brailovsky & Barrera, 2016
 Ethaltomarus Scudder, 1963
 Gressittocoris Slater & Zheng, 1985
 Icaracoris Slater, 1985
 Longinischus Brailovsky, 2009
 Longinomerus Brailovsky & Barrera, 2010
 Lygofuscanellus Scudder, 1962
 Marmottania Puton & Lethierry, 1887
 Micrymenus Bergroth, 1921
 Migdilybs Hesse, 1925
 Neolonginischus Brailovsky & Barrera, 2016
 Noualhieria Puton, 1889
 Omacrus Bergroth, 1916
 Ozophora Uhler, 1871
 Pamozophora Ashlock & Slater, 1982
 Paraporta Zheng, 1981
 Porta Distant, 1903
 Primierus Distant, 1901
 Prosomoeus Scott, 1874
 Pseudomenotelus Brailovsky & Cervantes, 2009
 Pseudomenus Ashlock & Slater, 1982
 Rugomenus Ashlock, 1985
 Tachytatus Bergroth, 1918
 Vertomannus Distant, 1903

References

Further reading

External links

 

Rhyparochromidae
Articles created by Qbugbot